Chayama Station (茶山駅) is the name of two train stations in Japan:

 Chayama Station (Fukuoka)
 Chayama Station (Kyoto)